Shira Rishony (born 21 February 1991) is an Israeli Olympic lightweight judoka. She competed at U48 kg (under 106 pounds). She competed for Israel at the 2016 Summer Olympics and at the 2020 Summer Olympics.

Early and personal life
Rishony was born in Holon, Israel, to a Jewish family. At the age of five, she was sent by her mother to learn ballet, despite her desire to learn judo. After two years, as she still insisted on learning judo, her mother finally gave in and allowed her to take part in the sport. Her sisters are named Rotem and Maya. Their grandfather is named Muki.

She resides in Even Yehuda, Israel, near the Wingate Institute.

Judo career
Rishony won the Israel U48 Women's Judo Championship in 2009 and 2012, won the silver medal in the competition in 2014, and won the bronze medal in 2007 and 2011.

In 2009, Rishony won gold medals in the 2009 Maccabiah Games and the Junior Tour U20 Izmir 'Cehat Sener'.

In 2012, she won the gold medal in the IJF World Cup Tashkent, and took the bronze medals in the World Cup Bucharest and the World Cup Istanbul. In 2013 Rishony won the gold medal at the Tashkent Grand Prix, and the bronze medal at Almaty Grand Prix, but was injured in a competition in Germany and lost six months of training and competition.

In 2014, Rishony won the gold medal at the European Open in Tallinn, and bronze medals at the Jeju Grand Prix and the Pan American Open San Salvador. In 2015, she won the bronze medal at the Grand Slam of Paris. In May 2015, she finished in 5th place at the World Masters in Rabat.

In 2016, she won the silver medal at the Havana Grand Prix.

Rishony, ranked 20th in the world, competed for Israel at the 2016 Summer Olympics in Women's Judo 48 kg, taking the additional place of Europe. In her first bout she was deemed to have illegally touched her opponent's leg with her elbow in her match against Ukrainian Maryna Cherniak, and was disqualified for illegal use of her elbow at 2:10 of her first bout. After the loss, she admitted "I still don’t understand why I was disqualified." In tears, Rishony said: "I’m still in shock, I felt I was ready and it hurts me that I couldn’t give my all and that it all ended before it really began... I was surprised by the decision of the judge... It’s hard to put in words how much you give and how much you sacrifice and how much you dream of this moment. You certainly don’t imagine it ending like this."

Rishony represented Israel at the 2020 Summer Olympics, competing at the women's 48 kg weight category. In her first match, she beat Colombia's Luz Álvarez by ippon, advancing to the round of 16. There, she submitted Spaniard 2021 World Championships bronze medalist Julia Figueroa who was seeded 5th in the Olympics.
In the Quarterfinals, Rishony lost to Mongolian former world champion Mönkhbatyn Urantsetseg, moving her to compete for a chance to win bronze through the Repechage. There, Rishont beat Taiwanese Lin Chen-hao, advancing to fight for the bronze medal. She lost the bronze medal match to Ukrainian former two-times world champion Daria Bilodid, finishing in fifth place.

Titles
Source:

Israeli championships
Partial list:
  2009 
  2012 
  2016 
  2017 
  2019 
  2014 
  2015 
  2007 
  2010 
  2011

References

External links

 
 
 
 Shira Rishony at the European Judo Union
 
 Rio bio 

1991 births
Living people
Israeli female judoka
Judoka at the 2015 European Games
European Games competitors for Israel
Judoka at the 2016 Summer Olympics
Olympic judoka of Israel
Judoka at the 2019 European Games
Sportspeople from Holon
Israeli Jews
Jewish sportspeople
Judoka at the 2020 Summer Olympics
Medalists at the 2020 Summer Olympics
Olympic medalists in judo
Olympic bronze medalists for Israel
20th-century Israeli women
21st-century Israeli women